Leonardo dos Santos Araújo (born 28 June 1992), known as Leo Araújo, is a Brazilian football player who plays for CF Canelas 2010.

Club career
He made his professional debut in the Campeonato Pernambucano for Náutico on 7 March 2012 in a game against Porto de Caruaru.

References

External links
 
 Leo Araújo at ZeroZero

Brazilian footballers
Association football defenders
Brazilian expatriate footballers
1992 births
Living people
Botafogo de Futebol e Regatas players
Clube Náutico Capibaribe players
Cianorte Futebol Clube players
Parnahyba Sport Club players
S.U. Sintrense players
A.D. Sanjoanense players
F.C. Oliveira do Hospital players
Sport Benfica e Castelo Branco players
Brazilian expatriate sportspeople in Portugal
Expatriate footballers in Portugal